Cândido José de Araújo Viana, Marquis of Sapucaí, (Nova Lima, 15 September 1793 — Rio de Janeiro, 23 January 1875) was a Brazilian politician and judge.

Public life
He was at various times Minister of Finance, Minister of Justice, Councillor of State, deputy, Provincial President and a Senator from 1840 to 1875, elected from Minas Gerais. He was President of the Senate 1851–1853.

He went to school in his native country, then went to the University of Coimbra in 1815. After graduating in law in 1821, he became a member of the Constituent Assembly in 1823 and then of the Chamber of Deputies representing Minas Gerais for three terms. He was appointed President of first Alagoas (1826) and then Maranhão provinces (1828). He was Crown Prosecutor, minister of the Supreme Court of Justice (1849), Finance Minister and an exceptional member of the Council of State from the time of its creation. As Minister of Imperial Affairs in the second conservative cabinet (1841-1843), he steered through the law which accorded senators the title “Your Excellency.”

Other roles
In 1839 he was appointed tutor in Literature and Positive Sciences to Crown Prince Pedro; later he was also placed in charme of the education of the Princess Imperial.

He was also vice-president of the Society for the Support of National Industry and Honorary Grand Master of the Grande Oriente do Brasil. He served on the founding board of the Brazilian Historic and Geographic Institute and was its president from 1847 to 1875.

Honours
He was decorated with the Order of Christ and the Order of the Rose, as well as the Grand Cross of the Order of the Tower and Sword and the Legion of Honour.  He was made viscount in 1854 and marquess in 1872. He was a privy councillor, gentleman of the bedchamber and knight of the Imperial Household.

Notes

References

External links
 Cândido José de Araújo Viana's biography 1
 Cândido José de Araújo Viana's biography 2
 Cândido José de Araújo Viana's biography 3

1793 births
1875 deaths
Brazilian male writers
Presidents of the Senate of the Empire of Brazil
Presidents of the Chamber of Deputies (Brazil)
Finance Ministers of Brazil
Brazilian nobility